The Movement for a Socialist Alternative (Nigeria) (MSA) is a Trotskyist political party in Nigeria.  It is affiliated to International Socialist Alternative.

Foundation
The Movement for a Socialist Alternative (MSA) was founded by former members of the Democratic Socialist Movement (DSM) who broke away from the DSM as a result of a split within the Committee for a Workers' International, with which the DSM had been aligned, and the undemocratic handling of the debate about the split by the majority of the DSM's National Executive Committee. The majority of the DSM's membership and branches left the DSM to form the MSA while a majority of the DSM's NEC supported a minority faction that left the CWI to become the Refounded CWI (now known as the CWI). The DSM's majority supported what was initially called the CWI-Majority but, has been known since January 2020 as International Socialist Alternative.

Campaigns
MSA have campaigned for the renationalization of the electricity supply industry under democratic control through elected representatives of the working people and community. This demand arose from increases in both prices and power outages. This led on to campaigning alongside the Nigeria Labour Congress and Trade Union Congress in the nationwide protest against the Nigerian Government over the increase in the price of petrol and electricity tariff. Oladimeji Macaulay, a member of MSA, speaking for a coalition of civil society groups under the umbrella of Nigerians Against Bad Policies said "no amount of intimidation and harassment by security operatives would stop them from embarking on the mass protest."
They have also called for the disbandment of Special Anti-Robbery Squad (SARS) and justice and compensation for the families of the people killed extra-judicially by the police and the bringing to trial of all involved in such killings. They also demand the democratic control by the mass of the working people, via their unions and organisations in the management and conduct of all police affairs and engagement with members of the public. This demand has fed into an evolving situation in Nigeria where protests ending in police brutality have led to more protests against the police. The MSA have called for police officers to have the right to join a union which would allow them to refuse orders to brutalise the public. "Police brutality is first and foremost a product of a debased system relied upon by politicians to keep the mass of the people who are cheated out of their resources at bay. The police act as a screen fencing off the political elites from the masses of people. Government officials that steal funds meant for job creation and industrialization would necessarily require a brutish police force to insulate them from the people’s anger. The Nigerian policemen also have the misfortune of lacking a union to defend officers that reject criminal orders for the brutalization of protesters for example and even for securing a dignified working condition for policemen."

Socialist Party of Nigeria
The DSM before the split launched an initiative for the Socialist Party of Nigeria which was inaugurated on 16 November 2013 in Lagos. Members of MSA continue to support SPN and oppose attempts by the state to deregister it.

References

Communist parties in Nigeria
End SARS
Trotskyist organizations in Africa
Political parties in Nigeria